{{Infobox football club
| clubname = Unión Santa María
| image = 
| fullname = Club Unión Santa María de Los Ángeles
| nickname = Angelinos, La Luciernaga, Mecánica, Marianos, Fluorescentes' papiti'
| founded  = November 19, 2009| 
| ground   = Estadio Municipal de Los ÁngelesLos Ángeles, Chile||
 capacity = 3,450
| chairman =  Pedro Heller
| manager =  Gerardo Silva
| league =  Tercera División
| season =  2010
| position = Tercera División B (Champion)
| Web    =  http://www.unionsantamaria.com
| pattern_la1=|pattern_b1=|pattern_ra1=
| leftarm1=BEF781|body1=BEF781|rightarm1=BEF781|shorts1=FFFFFF|socks1=FFFFFF
| pattern_la2=|pattern_b2=|pattern_ra2=
| leftarm2=FFFFFF|body2=FFFFFF|rightarm2=FFFFFF|shorts2=FFFFFF|socks2=FFFFFF
}}

Unión Santa María is a Chilean Football club, their home town is Los Ángeles, Chile. They currently play in the fourth level of Chilean football, the Tercera División.

The club were founded on November 19, 2009 and participated for 1 year in Tercera División A and 1 year in Cuarta División.

Seasons played
1 season in Tercera División1 season in Cuarta División''

Current Squad 2012

Titles
 Cuarta División: 2010

See also 
 Chilean football league system

External links 
Club Website 

Football clubs in Chile
Association football clubs established in 2009
2009 establishments in Chile